Maple Island can mean:

Maple Island (Lake Superior), island in Lake Superior
Maple Island (Rideau River), island in the Rideau River
Maple Island, a community in Whitestone, Ontario
Maple Island, Washington County, Minnesota
Maple Island, Freeborn County, Minnesota
A fictional island in MapleStory